Fadil Hoxha (Serbian: Фадиљ Хоџа, Fadilj Hodža; 15 March 1916 – 21 April 2001) was a Yugoslavian ethnic Albanian communist revolutionary and politician from Kosovo. He was a member of the Communist party and fought in the Yugoslav Partisans during World War II. After the war, he was the first President of the Executive Council of the Autonomous Region of Kosovo and Metohija (1945-1963) and later member of the Presidency of Yugoslavia (1974-1984).

Early life
As a young man, Hoxha migrated from his home town of Gjakova to attend secondary school in Albania, since secondary education in the Albanian language was unavailable in Yugoslavia. He continued his education in the town of Shkodër and later in Elbasan. In Albania he joined a communist cell which provided him with his first exposure to the ideas of Marxism-Leninism. In 1939, during fascist Italy's invasion of Albania, Hoxha became active in the emerging resistance movement against the Italian occupation among Albanian youth.

Hoxha returned to Kosovo in 1941, where he worked as a teacher. In the same year he abandoned his post to become one of the founders of the communist partisan movement in Kosovo. Within a short time Hoxha rose through the partisan ranks to become commander, leading battalions which had in their ranks Kosovo Albanians and Serbs who fought against Fascism and Nazism and the Italian and later German occupation of Kosovo.

Hoxha was instrumental in the Kosovo communist movement's efforts at adopting a resolution at the Bujan Conference of 1943, which expressed the wish of Kosovo for national self-determination and unification with Albania. However, under Serbian pressure, the Yugoslav Communist Party annulled the resolution, which resulted in Hoxha's marginalization in the party after the end of the war in 1945 and Kosovo's reinstitution into Serbia with a limited degree of autonomy.

Politics
Hoxha's political influence in the Yugoslav Communist Party grew during the 1960s, especially after the removal from the upper echelons of the party of Serb hardliner Aleksandar Ranković by Josip Broz Tito. As interior minister, Ranković had pursued a notorious policy of repression against Albanians, which was later criticized by the party. Hoxha led efforts to advance Kosovo's constitutional status in a series of constitutional reforms that took place in Yugoslavia. The efforts were consecrated by the Yugoslav constitution of 1974, which granted Kosovo an equal republican status in all but name.

Hoxha also fought for the expansion of federal aid and development programs in Kosovo, which led to Kosovo's rapid industrialization throughout the 1960s and 1970s. Hoxha also led or otherwise supported political battles for the expansion of cultural and educational institutions in the Albanian language, leading to the virtual eradication of illiteracy among the Albanian population and the establishment of the Albanian-language University of Pristina in 1970, as well as a Kosovo Academy of Arts and Sciences.

During his political career in socialist Yugoslavia, Hoxha subscribed to the principles of Yugoslav policy of "brotherhood and unity", believing in the need to achieve national equality between Albanians, Serbs, and other national groups within Kosovo and Yugoslavia. In practice, given the grave cultural and economic backwardness which previous regimes had left Albanians in Kosovo, Hoxha believed that overcoming the disadvantages faced by Albanians required special affirmative measures both within Kosovo and at the federal level. Kosovo had inherited the highest illiteracy rates in all of Yugoslavia and was also its poorest region. Hoxha consistently initiated or supported policies which would address these problems, including expanding the educational opportunities of Albanians, expanding Yugoslav programs supporting industrial development in Kosovo, and policies addressing the relative inequality of Albanians in employment, who had disproportionately high unemployment rates.

Hoxha held a number of high posts in Kosovo and Yugoslavia. He served as president of the Assembly of the Kosovo Autonomous Province. He also received the title of People's Hero of Yugoslavia. In 1967 he was appointed to the Yugoslav Communist Party Presidium and in 1974 became a member of the Federal Presidency. In 1978-79 he held the rotating post of Vice President of the Federal Presidency, the highest leadership post in Yugoslavia under Tito.

In 1981, Hoxha faced harsh criticism from radical Kosovo Albanian nationalist movements because of his opposition to the massive demonstrations that occurred in the spring of that year, which demanded republican status for Kosovo. Hoxha and the Kosovar provincial leaders also faced criticism by the Yugoslav party leadership for failures in curtailing the rise of Albanian nationalism in Kosovo.

After the rise of Slobodan Milošević in Serbia, Hoxha, though retired, became subject to a number of political attacks labelling him a nationalist and supporter of secessionism. Hoxha was expelled from the League of Communists of Yugoslavia and in 1991 the Milošević government tried him for treason.

After his retirement in 1986, Hoxha had withdrawn from public life and was notorious for refusing to grant interviews to the press. However, he continued to throw his support behind popular movements in Kosovo. In 1989, Hoxha supported the 1989 Kosovo miners' strike at the Trepça/Trepča Mines protesting against political attacks from Serbia aiming at the erosion of Kosovo's self-government. In 1990, Hoxha became a supporter of the Democratic League of Kosovo and its leader Ibrahim Rugova, in its struggle for an independent Kosovo. In 1998, Hoxha, together with other members of the Association of Veterans of the Anti-Fascist National Liberation War, threw their support behind the armed struggle of the Kosovo Liberation Army (KLA). In a 1998 meeting with the political representative of the KLA in Pristina, Adem Demaçi, Hoxha declared that if he were a young man, he would not wait a minute to join the KLA. He supported the NATO intervention during the Kosovo War.

Though in old age, Hoxha survived the 1999 Kosovo War and remained in hiding in Kosovo. He died of natural causes in 2001, and was buried with high honours in his home town of Gjakova.

Hoxha has published his wartime diary Kur pranvera vonohet [When Spring is Late] (Prishtina: Rilindja, 1980) and a three-volume collection of speeches and articles in Jemi në shtëpinë tonë [This is our Home] (Prishtina: Rilindja, 1986), both published in Serbian (Kad proleće kasni : iz partizanske beležnice) and Turkish editions in addition to the original Albanian. In 2010, an autobiography based on interviews with Fadil Hoxha by Veton Surroi and his father Rexhai Surroi was published under the title "Fadil Hoxha në vetën e parë" [Fadil Hoxha, in the first person] (Prishtina: Koha, 2010). In November 2011, his former associate Ekrem Murtezai published a book called "Fadil Hoxha, siç e njoha une" [Fadil Hoxha, as I knew him]. In 2007, the Association of Veterans of the Anti-Fascist National Liberation War published a collected volume, "Fadil Hoxha - një jetë në shërbim të atdheut" containing documents and memoirs on Hoxha's role during and after World War II.

Succession

Notes and references
Notes:

References:
 
 
 

1916 births
2001 deaths
Politicians from Gjakova
League of Communists of Kosovo politicians
Central Committee of the League of Communists of Yugoslavia members
Yugoslav Albanians
Recipients of the Order of the Hero of Socialist Labour